Lampaul-Ploudalmézeau is a commune in the Finistère department of Brittany in north-western France.

Population
Inhabitants of Lampaul-Ploudalmézeau are called in French Lampaulais.

See also
Communes of the Finistère department

References

External links

Sports and leisure associations portal of Lampaul Ploudalmézeau
Mayors of Finistère Association 

Communes of Finistère